Danijel Cerović (Montenegrin Cyrillic: Данијел Церовић), born in 1979 in Nikšić, is a Montenegrin classical guitarist. He lectures in guitar and chamber music at the Music Academy in Cetinje, University of Montenegro and he is a guest lecturer at the Sarajevo Music Academy.

Biography

Cerović graduated at the Faculty of Music Arts in Belgrade in the class of Professor Vera Ogrizović, and completed his master studies in guitar at the Conservatorium Maastricht in the class of Professor Carlo Marchione. His solo repertoire includes the transcriptions of renaissance and baroque music and original compositions dating from the nineteenth and twentieth centuries, with a special emphasis on contemporary music originally written for guitar and ensembles with guitar.

He is a member of the Montenegrin Guitar Duo, together with guitar virtuoso Goran Krivokapić, they arranged and recorded J.S. Bach’s English Suites for Naxos Records. This world première recording received praise by both audience and music critics alike such as Classics Today, Classical Net for their historically informed performances in a new, fresh approach on two guitars. Their début recording with works by Carlo Domeniconi, Ástor Piazzolla and Dušan Bogdanović was released in 2013 by the MMC Records.

In September he signed a deal with Naxos Records to record the lute music by Sylvius Leopold Weiss that he transcriber for solo guitar.

He is the artistic director of Montenegro International Guitar Competition (part of Eurostrings Festival).

Discography

References

External links
 Danijel Cerović BBC Music
 Danijel Cerović - Savarez
 Danijel Cerović - Dan McDaniel Management
 Sarajevo International Guitar Festival

Maastricht Academy of Music alumni
Montenegrin classical musicians
Living people
Montenegrin musicians
1979 births
Academic staff of the University of Montenegro
University of Arts in Belgrade alumni
People from Nikšić